Pribytkovo is a rural locality (a village) in Mayskoye Rural Settlement, Vologodsky District, Vologda Oblast, Russia. The population was 4 as of 2002.

Geography 
The distance to Vologda is 27 km, to Maysky is 7 km.

References 

Rural localities in Vologodsky District